Cooktown Airport  is an airport in Cooktown, Queensland, Australia and is the gateway to Cape York Peninsula.

Airlines and destinations

See also
 List of airports in Queensland

References

Airports in Queensland